George Roll is an American ice hockey coach. He was the head coach of the Clarkson Golden Knights from 2003 thorugh the end of the 2010-2011 season, leading them to their most recent conference championship and NCAA tournament appearance.

Career
Roll began his coaching career shortly after finishing his college career at Bowling Green where he was part of the 1984 National Championship team. He became a graduate assistant for his alma mater before joining first-year coach Mark Morris's staff at Clarkson. Roll remained as an assistant for eight years, helping Morris establish Clarkson as a power in ECAC Hockey, winning two regular season titles, two tournament titles, and making the NCAA tournament six times, including a Frozen Four appearance for the first time in over 20 years.

Roll left Clarkson to become the head coach of Oswego State, a Division III program, and in each of his seven years there the Great Lakers finished with a winning record. Unfortunately, other than a tournament appearance in his second season, Oswego State didn't have much else to show for his tenure until 2002-2003 when Roll pushed the Great Lakers to a 25-7-1 record, earning a regular season title, a conference championship, and were runners-up to the D-III National Title.  Roll, however, decided against building on his earlier success after he was offered the top job at Clarkson, replacing his mentor Mark Morris after he was fired due to an incident in early November.

The first few years with the Golden Knights were rocky as Clarkson couldn't manage a winning record until the third year, but Clarkson won 25 games in 2006–07, including a conference championship and when they earned a regular season crown the following season it appeared that they had turned the corner. After that brief success, however, Clarkson declined rapidly, ending with losing records in each of the next three seasons and causing Roll termination at the end of the 2010–11 season. Roll quickly found a new job as he was announced as the first head coach for Nazareth College's new Division-III ice hockey program that was to begin in 2012-13. As of 2021 he is still in that position.

Head coaching record

References

External links

1962 births
American ice hockey coaches
Clarkson Golden Knights men's ice hockey coaches
Living people
Ice hockey coaches from Illinois
NCAA men's ice hockey national champions